Aleksandr Andreyevich Seraskhov (born 5 February 1994) is a Russian football player. He plays for FC Spartak Kostroma.

Club career
He made his debut in the Russian Football National League for FC Sokol Saratov on 14 March 2015 in a game against FC Sakhalin Yuzhno-Sakhalinsk.

He played for FC Lokomotiv Moscow in the 2014–15 UEFA Europa League play-off round game against Apollon Limassol.

References

External links
 Profile by Russian Football National League

1994 births
Footballers from Moscow
Living people
Russian footballers
Association football defenders
FC Lokomotiv Moscow players
FC Sokol Saratov players
FC Olimp-Dolgoprudny players
FC KAMAZ Naberezhnye Chelny players
FC Tom Tomsk players
FC Spartak Kostroma players
Russia youth international footballers
Russia under-21 international footballers
Russian First League players
Russian Second League players